Esteban Daniel Pérez Spatazza (born March 26, 1966 in Rosario, Santa Fe) is a retired male basketball player (2.00 metres) from Argentina, who competed for his native country at the 1996 Summer Olympics in Atlanta, Georgia, finishing in ninth place in the overall-rankings. He was nicknamed "Gallo" during his career.

References

1966 births
Living people
Argentine men's basketball players
Olympic basketball players of Argentina
Basketball players at the 1996 Summer Olympics
Sportspeople from Rosario, Santa Fe
Liga ACB players
CB Murcia players
Olimpo basketball players
Estudiantes de Bahía Blanca basketball players
Peñarol de Mar del Plata basketball players
Quilmes de Mar del Plata basketball players
Libertad de Sunchales basketball players
Olimpia de Venado Tuerto basketball players
G.E.P.U. basketball players
Pan American Games medalists in basketball
Pan American Games gold medalists for Argentina
Basketball players at the 1995 Pan American Games
Medalists at the 1995 Pan American Games
1994 FIBA World Championship players